Dard (Pain) is a 1981 Bollywood crime film directed by Ambrish Sangal. Rajesh Khanna, who has a double role in the film was nominated for a Filmfare Award for Best Actor in 1982 for his performance in this film. The film was successful at box office. It ran to silver jubilee at Mumbai and at other centers. Khayyam composed very good music.

Plot
Deepak (Rajesh Khanna) is accused of killing a courtesan, Munnibai and a trial take place in court. His lover Seema (Hema Malini) appears against him as public prosecutor and gets him life imprisonment. Seema remembers her days with Deepak three years ago, when both were ardent lovers and how she loved him. Both consider themselves as married and united by their souls. Deepak wants to meet Seema and she unwillingly meets him in jail. Deepak explains to her how fate brought him into jail.

Deepak is a lawyer and looks for good opportunities in his career. He has a sister Sushma (Poornima Jayaram), the only family he has left in this world. Seema introduces Deepak to her father, who dislikes their relationship, but pretends to accept them. Seema's father urges her to pursue her law career in America, but she refuses as she does not want to leave Deepak for three years. Deepak persuades her to go ahead and Seema obeys him, hoping to get married after three years. After Seema has left, Seema's father shows Deepak his real face and orders Deepak to go away from Seema and Deepak does not accept. Deepak's sister Sushma has got engaged with a man named Ajit and Deepak arranges for their marriage. Ajit initially behaves well, understanding Deepak's financial position, but turns evil when Seema's father tempts him with money to ask for dowry during their marriage and Ajit does so. Unable to get as much money as Ajit asked for, Deepak goes to Seema's father for help. Seema's father agrees to help him on the condition that he should marry another girl and leave Seema forever. Unwillingly, Deepak accepts for his sister's sake and marries another woman. But his wife dies in a year after giving birth to their son Vicky. Left alone with his child, Deepak's misfortune chases him when Ajit kills a courtesan Munnibai. Deepak takes the blame on himself and lands in jail. Seema understands her father's role behind everything and wants to make an appeal on the verdict, but Deepak stops her. He requests her to take care of his child Vicky and accept him as her son, to which Seema promises.

Seema becomes mother of Vicky and raises him and Deepak spends his life in jail. As years passed, Vicky (Rajesh Khanna) returns from America after completing his studies and Deepak gets released from prison. He does not want Vicky to know that he is his father as he is very unlucky man and his misfortunes should not affect his son. Vicky brings his lover Poonam (Poonam Dhillon) and introduces her to his mother. Deepak gets a job of gardener in Poonam's house and Vicky becomes a successful lawyer, replacing his mother Seema as public prosecutor. Deepak feels happy on seeing his son whenever he visits Poonam's home. Poonam and Vicky get engaged and everything goes smooth until the arrival of Ajit, who is now an evil drunkard. Ajit blackmails Seema that he wishes to meet Vicky and tell about Deepak to him. Seema yields to his blackmail as she does not want to break the promise made to Deepak about exposing the father-son relationship to Vicky. In due course, Ajit is killed and Deepak is accused of killing him. Vicky appears as public prosecutor against him without knowing that he is his father and demands imprisonment for Deepak. Seema appears in defence for Deepak. Seema struggles hard to keep up the promise given to Deepak, but Vicky tests her patience severely.

Cast
Rajesh Khanna as Deepak Srivastav / Vikas "Vicky" Srivastav (Double role)
Hema Malini as Seema
Poonam Dhillon as Poonam Bhargav
Ranjeeta Kaur (Sp. App.)
Poornima Jayaram
Pinchoo Kapoor as Bhargav 
Mazhar Khan as Ajit Saxena
Shashi Puri
Om Shivpuri as Dayal 
Shashi Kiran as Police Inspector
Paidi Jairaj as Jailor Durga Dass

Music
The songs of the film are composed by Khayyam with lyrics written by Naqsh Lyallpuri.

Awards
 29th Filmfare Awards (1982) - Rajesh Khanna was nominated in Best Actor category.

External links
 

1981 films
1980s Hindi-language films
Fictional portrayals of police departments in India
1980s crime films
Films scored by Khayyam